Sheikh Khalifa bin Zayed bin Sultan Al Nahyan (7 September 1948 – 13 May 2022) was the second president of the United Arab Emirates and the ruler of Abu Dhabi, serving from November 2004 until his death in May 2022.

Khalifa was the eldest son of Zayed bin Sultan Al Nahyan, the first president of the United Arab Emirates. As crown prince of Abu Dhabi, Khalifa carried out some aspects of the presidency in a de facto capacity from the late 1990s when his father experienced health problems. He succeeded his father as the ruler of Abu Dhabi on 2 November 2004, and the Federal Supreme Council elected him as president of the UAE the following day. As ruler of Abu Dhabi, he attracted cultural and academic centres to Abu Dhabi, helping establish the Louvre Abu Dhabi, New York University Abu Dhabi and Sorbonne University Abu Dhabi. He also established Etihad Airways.

During Khalifa's presidency, the United Arab Emirates became a regional economic powerhouse and its non-oil economy grew. Khalifa was viewed as a pro-Western modernizer whose low-key approach helped steer the country through a tense era in regional politics and forged closer ties with the United States and Israel. As president during the financial crisis of 2007–2008, he directed the payment of billions of dollars in emergency bailout funds into Dubai. On 4 January 2010, the world's tallest man-made structure, originally known as Burj Dubai, was renamed the Burj Khalifa in his honor.

In January 2014, Khalifa had a stroke and was in stable condition after surgery. He then assumed a lower profile in state affairs but retained ceremonial presidential powers. His half-brother Mohamed bin Zayed Al Nahyan carried out public affairs of the state and day-to-day decision-making of the Emirate of Abu Dhabi. In 2018, Forbes named Khalifa in its list of the world's most powerful people. Following his death on May 13 2022, Khalifa was succeeded by his brother Mohamed.

Early life and education 
Khalifa was born on 7 September 1948 at Qasr Al-Muwaiji, Al Ain, in Abu Dhabi (then part of the Trucial States), the eldest son of Hassa bint Mohammed Al Nahyan and Zayed bin Sultan Al Nahyan. He was a graduate of the Royal Military Academy Sandhurst.

Political career

As Ruler's representative and Crown Prince: 1966–1971 
When his father, Zayed, became Emir of Abu Dhabi in 1966, Khalifa was appointed the Ruler's Representative in the Eastern Region of Abu Dhabi and Head of the Courts Department in Al Ain. Zayed was the Ruler's Representative in the Eastern Region before he became the Emir of Abu Dhabi. A few months later the position was handed to Tahnoun bin Mohammed Al Nahyan.

On 1 February 1969, Khalifa was nominated the Crown Prince of Abu Dhabi, and on the next day he was appointed Head of the Abu Dhabi Department of Defence. In that post, he oversaw the build up of the Abu Dhabi Defense Force, which after 1971 became the core of the UAE Armed Forces.

As Deputy Prime Minister 
Following the establishment of the UAE in 1971, Khalifa assumed several positions in Abu Dhabi as head of the Abu Dhabi Cabinet. After the reconstruction of the Cabinet of the United Arab Emirates, the Abu Dhabi Cabinet was replaced by the Abu Dhabi Executive Council, and Khalifa became the 2nd Deputy Prime Minister of the United Arab Emirates (23 December 1973) and the Chairman of the Executive Council of Abu Dhabi (20 January 1974).

In May 1976, he became deputy commander of the UAE Armed Forces, under the President. He also became the head of the Supreme Petroleum Council in the late 1980s. The post granted him wide powers in energy matters. He was also the chairman of the Environmental Research and Wildlife Development Agency.

As President: 2004–2022 
He succeeded to the post of Emir of Abu Dhabi and was elected President of the United Arab Emirates (UAE) on 3 November 2004, replacing his father Zayed bin Sultan Al Nahyan, who had died the day before. He had been acting president since his father became ill prior to his death.

On 1 December 2005, the President announced that half of the members of the Federal National Council (FNC), an assembly that advises the president, would be indirectly elected. Half of the council's members were still appointed by the leaders of the emirates.

In 2009, Khalifa was re-elected as President for a second five-year term.

In 2010, Khalifa was described in a WikiLeaks cable signed by then U.S. ambassador Richard G. Olson as a "distant and uncharismatic personage." The cable said that Khalifa had risked his reputation and the UAE’s future since 1990, when he described the United States as willing to shed blood to maintain international order and stability in the Gulf.

In March 2011, Khalifa sent the United Arab Emirates Air Force to support the military intervention in Libya against Muammar Gaddafi, alongside forces from NATO, Qatar, Sweden and Jordan.

Khalifa pledged the full support of the UAE to the Bahrain in the face of pro-democracy uprising in 2011.

Later that year Khalifa was ranked as the world's fourth-wealthiest monarch, with a fortune estimated to be worth $15 billion.

In January 2014, Khalifa had a stroke and was reported to have been in a stable condition after undergoing an operation.

During his presidency in February 2022, the UAE signed partnership agreements with Israel on tourism and healthcare.

Personal life 

Khalifa was the eldest son of Zayed bin Sultan Al Nahyan and Hassa bint Mohammed bin Khalifa Al Nahyan.

He was married to Shamsa bint Suhail Al Mazrouei, and had eight children: Sultan, Mohammed, Shamma, Salama, Osha, Sheikha, Lateefa and Mouza.

Investments and foreign aid 
Seychellois government records show that since 1995 Sheikh Khalifa has spent $2 million buying up more than 66 acres of land on the Seychelles' main island of Mahé, where what was to be his palace is being built. The Seychelles' government has received large aid packages from the UAE, most notably a $130 million injection that was used in social service and military aid, which funded patrol boats for the Seychelles' antipiracy efforts. In 2008, the UAE came to the indebted Seychelles government's aid, with a $30 million injection.

Sheikh Khalifa paid $500,000 for the 29.8-acre site of his palace in 2005, according to the sales document. A Seychelles planning authority initially rejected the palace's building plans, a decision overturned by President James Michel's cabinet. A month after the start of construction of the palace, the national utility company warned that the site's plans posed threats to the water supply. Joel Morgan, the Seychelles' minister of the environment, said the government did not tender the land because it wanted it to go to Sheikh Khalifa. Morgan said "the letter of the law" might not have been followed in the land sale.

In February 2010, the sewage system set up by Ascon, the company building the palace, for the site's construction workers overflowed, sending rivers of waste through the region, which is home to more than 8000 residents. Local government agencies and officials from Khalifa's office responded quickly to the problem, sending in technical experts and engineers. Government officials concluded that Ascon ignored health and building codes for their workers, and fined the company $81,000. Ascon blamed the incident on "unpredicted weather conditions". Khalifa's presidential office offered to pay $15 million to replace the water-piping system for the mountainside, and Seychelles' government representatives and residents say Ascon has offered to pay roughly $8,000 to each of the 360 households that were affected by the pollution.

Through the Khalifa bin Zayed Al Nahyan Foundation, the UAE supported the Yemeni people in August 2015 with 3,000 tonnes of food and aid supplies. By 19 August 2015, the foundation had sent Yemen 7,800 tonnes of food, medicine, and medical supplies.

In April 2016, Sheikh Khalifa was named in the Panama Papers by the International Consortium of Investigative Journalists; he reportedly owned luxury properties in London worth more than $1.7 billion via shell companies that Mossack Fonseca set up and administers for him in the British Virgin Islands.

Death
Sheikh Khalifa died on 13 May 2022, at the age of 73. He was buried at Al Bateen Cemetery in Abu Dhabi. His half-brother Mohamed succeeded him as ruler of Abu Dhabi upon his death, and was elected as president of the UAE the next day.

The Ministry of Presidential Affairs announced a 40-day national mourning with flags at half-mast along with a three-day suspension of work in private firms and the official entities at the federal and local levels of institution. State mourning was also announced in many other Arab League nations. Bahrain, Lebanon, Oman, Mauritania, Qatar, Egypt, Morocco, Maldives declared official mourning and flags at half-mast for three days. In Jordan, mourning was declared for 40 days while flags will fly half-mast in Kuwait. Saudi Arabia declared three days of mourning with all recreational, sporting events and festivities postponed. Pakistan announced a three-day mourning and flags were raised at half-mast. Brazil declared three days of mourning, Algeria declared two days of mourning with flags to be flown at half-mast. Palestine declared a day of mourning and ordered flags to be flown at half-mast. India also declared a period of national mourning with flags at half-staff for one day starting from 14 May 2022. Bangladesh declared one day of state mourning on Saturday. Cuba declared one day of mourning on 17 May.

Honours

 Brazil: Collar of the Order of the Southern Cross (12 November 2021)
 Spain: 
 Knight Grand Cross of the Order of Isabella the Catholic of Spain (4 December 1981)
 Knight Grand Cross with Collar of the Order of Civil Merit (23 May 2008)
 United Kingdom: 
 Honorary Knight Grand Cross of the Most Honourable Order of the Bath (25 November 2010)
 Honorary Knight Grand Cross of the Most Distinguished Order of St Michael and St George 
 The Netherlands: Knight Grand Cross of the Order of the Netherlands Lion (8 January 2012)
 South Korea: Member of the Grand Order of Mugunghwa (21 November 2012)
 Ukraine: Order of Prince Yaroslav the Wise I degree (26 November 2012)

Ancestry

See also

 List of rulers of individual Emirates of the United Arab Emirates
 List of royalty by net worth

References

External links 

  Biography of U.A.E. President

1948 births
2022 deaths
Children of presidents of the United Arab Emirates
Collars of the Order of Civil Merit
Deputy Prime Ministers of the United Arab Emirates
Emirati billionaires
Emirati Muslims
Government ministers of the United Arab Emirates
Graduates of the Royal Military Academy Sandhurst
Honorary Knights Grand Cross of the Order of St Michael and St George
Honorary Knights Grand Cross of the Order of the Bath
House of Al Nahyan
Knights Grand Cross of the Order of Isabella the Catholic
People named in the Panama Papers
Presidents of the United Arab Emirates
Recipients of the Order of Prince Yaroslav the Wise, 1st class
Recipients of the Order of the Netherlands Lion
Sheikhs of Abu Dhabi